The 1979 European Tour was a series of golf tournaments that comprised the Professional Golfers' Association (PGA) European Tournament Players' Division (ETPD) run PGA European Golf Tour. It was the first time the circuit carried the European Tour name and is officially recognised as the eighth season of the PGA European Tour.

Historically, the PGA's Order of Merit only included tournaments in Great Britain and Ireland, but in 1970 events in continental Europe were included for the first time. The circuit and organisation evolved further over the following years, and adopted the title PGA European Golf Tour for the 1979 season. Also for the first time in 1979, players from continental Europe were eligible for the Ryder Cup.

The season was made up of 23 tournaments counting for the official money list, and some non-counting tournaments that later became known as "Approved Special Events". It included the major national opens around Europe, with the other tournaments mostly being held in England, Wales and Scotland.

The official money list was won by Scotland's Sandy Lyle.

Changes for 1979
There were several changes from the previous season, with the addition of the Welsh Golf Classic and Lada English Golf Classic. A new team event was also planned for France, replacing the Sumrie Better-Ball, but it was not held.

The tour's money list was retitled as the "Official Money List", having previously been known as the "Order of Merit".

Schedule
The following table lists official events during the 1979 season.

Unofficial events
The following events were sanctioned by the European Tour, but did not carry official money, nor were wins official.

Official money list
The official money list was based on prize money won during the season, calculated in Pound sterling.

Awards

See also
List of golfers with most European Tour wins

Notes

References

External links
1979 season results on the PGA European Tour website
1979 Order of Merit on the PGA European Tour website

European Tour seasons
European Tour